Pablo Somblingo (born 1932) is a Filipino sprinter. He competed in the men's 400 metres at the 1956 Summer Olympics. He was also the silver medalist in the same event at the 1958 Asian Games.

References

1932 births
Living people
Athletes (track and field) at the 1954 Asian Games
Athletes (track and field) at the 1958 Asian Games
Medalists at the 1954 Asian Games
Medalists at the 1958 Asian Games
Athletes (track and field) at the 1956 Summer Olympics
Filipino male sprinters
Filipino male hurdlers
Olympic track and field athletes of the Philippines
Place of birth missing (living people)
Asian Games medalists in athletics (track and field)
Asian Games silver medalists for the Philippines
Asian Games bronze medalists for the Philippines